Sir Geoffrey Cornewall, 6th Baronet (7 May 1869 – 21 January 1951) of Moccas Court, Herefordshire, was a British archer who competed at the 1908 Summer Olympics in London.

Origins
He was born at Moccas Court, Moccas, in Herefordshire. He was educated at Eton College and then at Trinity Hall, Cambridge, where he was a member of the Pitt Club.

Archery career
Cornewall entered the double York round event in 1908, taking 15th place with 430 points. He also participated in the Continental style event but his result is unknown.

Political career
He succeeded his father to the Cornewall Baronetcy on 25 September 1908. He was a Justice of the Peace and Deputy Lieutenant for Herefordshire, and was appointed High Sheriff of Herefordshire in 1913 and Vice Lord-Lieutenant in 1934.  He was an Alderman of the Herefordshire County Council.

References

1869 births
1951 deaths
People educated at Eton College
Alumni of Trinity Hall, Cambridge
British male archers
Olympic archers of Great Britain
Archers at the 1908 Summer Olympics
Baronets in the Baronetage of Great Britain
High Sheriffs of Herefordshire
Deputy Lieutenants of Herefordshire